, also titled Manie-Manie on its title card, is a 1987 anime science fiction anthology film produced by Project Team Argos and Madhouse. The film was conceived and produced by Madhouse founders Masao Maruyama and Rintaro, the latter of whom served as composition organizer alongside Katsuhiro Otomo on the project.

The 50 minute-long film has three segments, each under a different screenwriter and film director: Rintaro's "Labyrinth Labyrinthos," an exploration into the maze of a little girl's mind, Yoshiaki Kawajiri's "Running Man," focusing on a deadly auto race, and Katsuhiro Ōtomo's "Construction Cancellation Order," a cautionary tale about man's dependency on technology. In addition to original music by Godiego's Mickie Yoshino, two prominently feature famous pieces of Western classical music: the first of Erik Satie's Gymnopédies and the "Toreador Song" of Georges Bizet's Carmen in "Labyrinth" and "Morning Mood" from Edvard Grieg's Peer Gynt score, in an ironic manner, in "The Order."

The film premiered on September 25, 1987, at that year's Tōkyō International Fantastic Film Festival. Other than festival screenings, Japanese distributor Toho originally relegated the film direct-to-video, releasing a VHS on October 10, 1987, but did eventually give it a general cinema release in Japan, on April 15, 1989. In English, the film was licensed, dubbed and released theatrically (as a double feature with the first Silent Möbius film) and to VHS in North America by Streamline Pictures, the license later being taken up by the now also out of business ADV Films.

Plot

Labyrinth Labyrinthos 
The short follows Sachi (Hideko Yoshida/Cheryl Chase), a girl locked in a game of hide-and-seek with her cat Cicerone. Her search leads her to an old longcase clock which doubles as a doorway to a labyrinth world. The world is filled with supernatural oddities and characters, such as cardboard working class citizens, an invisible dog, a skeleton-led train and a weird circus. Eventually, Sachi and Cicerone arrive at a circus tent where a viewing screen is displayed, leading to the following segments.

The Running Man
Zack Hugh (Toshiyuki Morikawa/Jeff Winkless) is the titular "Man Who Cannot Die" the undefeated champion of the "Death Circus" racing circuit and has raced for 10 years. Competitors race in high-speed Formula One-like craft, and spectators bet on the lives of these people for huge winnings. A Marlowe-esque journalist (Norio Wakamoto/Steve Kramer) is sent to interview the mysterious Zack outside of the track and watches one of his races. He soon discovers Hugh has telekinetic abilities which he uses to destroy the other racers, after quietly observing him in the dark, chronically over-using a training interface inside his penthouse. As the race ends in his favor, the monitors in the pit display "LIFE FUNCTIONS TERMINATED."  Mysteriously, though seemingly dead, Hugh continues around the track and is overtaken by a spectral racer. He attempts to employ the same strategy, straining to destroy the opponent, but in truth it is against his own mind. The force of the telekinesis is directed inward which rapidly tears both Hugh and the vehicle apart. The Death Circus is permanently shut down afterwards; the reporter believing the event's true draw was the spectators' need to see how long the racer could beat death.

Construction Cancellation Order 
A revolution in the fictional South American country of the Aloana Republic has resulted in a new government being installed; this new government refuses to accept a contract detailing the construction of Facility 444. The company responsible for the construction has begun to lose millions, so salaryman Tsutomu Sugioka (Yū Mizushima/Robert Axelrod) is sent to stop production. The work is completely automated, carried out by robots programmed to finish the job no matter the consequences and led by a robot identified as 444-1 (Hiroshi Ōtake/Jeff Winkless). Witnessing the destruction of several robots and Robot 444-1's refusal to cease operations, Tsutomu begins to lose his patience and is nearly killed by 444-1 who was programmed to eliminate anything that poses a threat to the project. He retaliates by destroying 444-1 and follows its powercord that leads to the energy source of the robots in an attempt to finally end the production.  Unknown to Tsutomu, the old government has been restored and they have agreed to honor the contract once more.

Production

Labyrinth Labyrinthos 
 is written for the screen and directed by Rintaro, with character design and animation direction by Atsuko Fukushima and art direction by Yamako Ishikawa. It serves as the anthology's "top-level" story, a framing device that leads into the other two works.

The Running Man
 is written for the screen and directed by Yoshiaki Kawajiri, with character design and animation direction by Kawajiri, mechanical design by Takashi Watabe and Satoshi Kumagai, key animation by Shinji Otsuka, Nobumasa Shinkawa, Toshio Kawaguchi and Kengo Inagaki and art direction by Katsushi Aoki. The segment also appeared on Episode 205 of Liquid Television with a different voice actor, Rafael Ferrer, than Michael McConnohie's Streamline dub.

Construction Cancellation Order 
 is written for the screen and directed by Katsuhiro Otomo, with character designs by Otomo and animation direction by Takashi Nakamura This segment's depiction of South America as a dangerous, unstable place is comparable to other depictions in the Japanese media during the 1990s such as Osamu Tezuka's 1987 comic Gringo.

Reception 
In a 2021 list of the "100 best anime movies of all-time", Paste magazine ranked Neo Tokyo at #10, writing "though for the most part absent of any real thematic connectivity, Neo-Tokyo is a concise and powerful example of the dizzying heights of technical mastery and aesthetic ambition anime can achieve when put in the hands of the medium's most inimitable creators."

See also 

 Robot Carnival
 Memories
 Short Peace

References

External links 
 
 
 

1987 anime films
 1987 anime OVAs
1980s science fiction films
Cyberpunk anime and manga
Cyberpunk films
Films based on multiple works
Films based on short fiction
Films directed by Yoshiaki Kawajiri
Films directed by Katsuhiro Otomo
Films directed by Rintaro
Films set in South America
Japanese anthology films
Japanese auto racing films
Japanese animated science fiction films
Madhouse (company)
Animated films about auto racing
Animated anthology films
Japanese robot films
Films about telekinesis
Toho animated films
ADV Films